Paul Humphreys is a British musician

Paul Humphreys may also refer to:

Paul Humphreys (philosopher)
Paul Humphreys (bluegrass musician)

See also
Paul Humphries (born 1965), former English cricketer
Paul Humphrey (disambiguation)